The 2009 FIVB Volleyball Boys' Youth World Championship was held in Jesolo and Bassano del Grappa, Italy from 28 August to 6 September 2009. 16 teams participated in the tournament.

Competing nations
The following national teams have qualified:

Venues
Palazzo del Turismo (Jesolo) – Pool B, D, E, F
Palasport Bassano (Bassano del Grappa) – Pool A, C, G, H

1st round

Pool A

|}

|}

Pool B

|}

|}

Pool C

|}

|}

Pool D

|}

|}

2nd round

Pool E

|}

|}

Pool F

|}

|}

Pool G

|}

|}

Pool H

|}

|}

Final round

Classification 13th–16th

|}

|}

Classification 9th–12th

|}

|}

Classification 5th–8th

|}

|}

Championship

|}

|}

Final standing

Awards
MVP:  Aleksandar Atanasijević
Best Scorer:  Luca Vettori
Best Spiker:  Masahiro Yanagida
Best Blocker:  Sebastián Sole
Best Server:  Ahmed Kerboua
Best Digger:  Saddem Hmissi
Best Receiver:  Ricardo Lucarelli Souza
Best Libero:  Antoni Llabrés

External links
 Official Website

FIVB Volleyball Boys' U19 World Championship
World Youth Championship
Volleyball
V